Joy FM may refer to:

Australia
 3JOY, or Joy 94.9, in Melbourne

Canada
 CIXN-FM, licensed to Fredericton, New Brunswick

Ghana 
 JOY FM (Ghana)

Japan
 FM Miyazaki

United States
 WJIS, licensed to Bradenton, Florida
 WVFJ-FM, licensed to Manchester, Georgia
 KSDA, licensed to Agat, Guam
 WJYW, licensed to Union City, Indiana, known as Joy FM from 1999 to 2015
 WBOC-FM, licensed to Princess Anne, Maryland, known as Joy 102.5 until 2015
 WHYT, licensed to Goodland Township, Michigan, known as Joy FM from 2000 to 2004
 WBCT, licensed to Grand Rapids, Michigan, known as Joy FM from 1986 to 1988
 KLJY, licensed to Clayton, Missouri
 WJYJ, licensed to Hickory, North Carolina
 WXRI, licensed to Winston-Salem, North Carolina
 WTJY, licensed to Asheboro, North Carolina
 WRFE, licensed to Chesterfield, South Carolina
 WTTX-FM, licensed to Appomattox, Virginia
 WPJW, licensed to Hurricane, West Virginia
 WSJY, licensed to Fort Atkinson, Wisconsin, formerly known as Joy FM
 WJMR-FM licensed to Milwaukee, Wisconsin, known as Joy FM from 1979 to 1983